Rudrakodisvarar Temple, Tirukalukundram, is a Siva temple in Tirukalukundram in Kancheepuram District in Tamil Nadu (India). This temple is also known as Urutthiran Temple, Rudhran Temple and Ruthrankoil.

Vaippu Sthalam
It is one of the shrines of the Vaippu Sthalams sung by Tamil Saivite Nayanar Appar.

Presiding deity
The presiding deity is known as Rudrakodisvarar. His consort is known as Tiripurasundari.

Shrines
The shrine of the presiding deity is facing east and the shrine of the goddess is facing south.

References

External links
 மூவர் தேவார வைப்புத்தலங்கள்,  uruthirakODi, Sl.No.42 of 139 temples
 Shiva Temples, தேவார வைப்புத்தலங்கள், உருத்திரகோடி, Sl.No.23 of 133 temples, page1

Shiva temples in Kanchipuram district